Norman John Whitehead is a footballer who played as a winger in the Football League for Southport, Rochdale, Rotherham United, Chester and Grimsby Town.

References

1948 births
Living people
Footballers from Liverpool
Association football wingers
English footballers
Skelmersdale United F.C. players
Southport F.C. players
Rochdale A.F.C. players
Rotherham United F.C. players
Chester City F.C. players
Grimsby Town F.C. players
Rhyl F.C. players
English Football League players